Trinity House may refer to:

Nautical authority agencies 
Trinity House, a UK private corporation governed under a Royal Charter, functions include the official Lighthouse Authority
Trinity House of Leith
Newcastle-upon-Tyne Trinity House
Hull Trinity House
Hull Trinity House Academy, an associated marine training school
Trinity House, Scarborough, original building for the society of Ship Owners and Master Mariners.

Architecture 
Trinity house (Philadelphia)